Kade Dykes is an Australian professional rugby league footballer who plays as a  for the Cronulla-Sutherland Sharks in the NRL.

Background
Kade Dykes is the son of former Cronulla player, Adam Dykes and grandson of John Dykes who also played for Cronulla.

Career

2022
Dykes made his first grade debut for Cronulla against fierce rivals St. George Illawarra in round 21 of the 2022 NRL season.

Statistics

NRL
 Statistics are correct as of the end of the 2022 season

References

External links
Cronulla Sharks profile

Living people
Year of birth missing (living people)
Australian rugby league players
Cronulla-Sutherland Sharks players
Rugby league fullbacks
Rugby league players from Dubbo